Kristen Wilson (born September 4, 1969) is a former American actress, best known as Miranda DuBaer in Twitches and Twitches Too and as Lisa Dolittle in the films Dr. Dolittle, Dr. Dolittle 2, and Dr. Dolittle 3.

Early life
Kristen Wilson was born on September 4, 1969, and raised in Chelmsford, Massachusetts, near Boston. She trained as a dancer there and worked with the Boston Ballet for four years. She received her Bachelor of Fine Arts degree in musical theatre from Syracuse University, but took some time off during her junior year to be in a national tour of West Side Story.

Career
Kristen made her film debut in the 1992 film Prototype and later landed a supporting role in Who's the Man? In 1995, Kristen moved to New York City, where she starred in the HBO TV movie Tyson as actress Robin Givens. Subsequently, she appeared alongside Damon Wayans and Adam Sandler in Bulletproof. Her other film credits include Get on the Bus, Walking Tall, Crossover, Dungeons and Dragons, Pompatus of Love, Girl 6, Cross-Eyed, Dr. Dolittle, Dr. Dolittle 2, and Dr. Dolittle 3. She also plays the biological mother of Camryn (Tamera Mowry) and Alex (Tia Mowry) in the Disney films Twitches and Twitches Too.

Wilson also has an extensive television career; she is well known for her recurring role on The District. Her other credits include My Wife and Kids, Crossing Jordan, New York Undercover, Matt Waters, and a pilot episode for the CBS' legal drama series Shark.

Wilson's work in theater consists of the Broadway hit Nick & Nora, 1492, The Hunchback, A FunnyForum, A My Name is Alice, The Club, and the national tour of West Side Story.

Personal life
Kristen was married to lighting technician Michael Marzovilla from 1997 to 1999. They have a daughter Ruby, who was born in 1998.  She has since remarried.

Filmography

Film

Television films

Television

References

External links

1969 births
Living people
People from Chelmsford, Massachusetts
Actresses from Massachusetts
20th-century American actresses
21st-century American actresses
African-American actresses
American adoptees
Syracuse University alumni
20th-century African-American women
21st-century African-American women
21st-century African-American people